The G103C Twin III is a high performance tandem two-seat sailplane made by Grob Aircraft. It replaced the Twin II in production and features a new triple-trapezoidal wing, automatic elevator connection, lower control forces and higher airspeed limitations.

Most Twin IIIs (102 of 115 built) were Twin III Acro models, with G-Limits of +6/-4g. However, aerobatic maneuvers were limited in 2003 by an airworthiness directive and could only be reinstated with fuselage reinforcements.

Specifications (Twin III Acro)

See also

References

External links
Homepage of Grob Aircraft AG

1980s German sailplanes
Grob aircraft
Aircraft first flown in 1989
T-tail aircraft